Decision quality (DQ) is the quality of a decision at the moment the decision is made, regardless of its outcome.  Decision quality concepts permit the assurance of both effectiveness and efficiency in analyzing decision problems.  In that sense, decision quality can be seen as an extension to decision analysis.  Decision quality also describes the process that leads to a high-quality decision.  Properly implemented, the DQ process enables capturing maximum value in uncertain and complex scenarios.

Decision and outcome 
Fundamental to all decision quality concepts is the distinction between the decision and its outcome. They are different because of the uncertainties when making a choice—a high quality decision can still result in a poor outcome, and vice versa. In the face of uncertainty, the decision maker only has control over the decision, but no control over the outcome of external circumstances. Consequently, the outcome of a decision does not allow an assessment about its quality. A decision has quality at the time it is made, which is not changed by hindsight. Concepts of decision quality focus on measuring and improving the quality of the decision at the time it is being made.

Elements 
The confidence a decision maker has in its choice, and related to it the commitment a decision maker has to act upon that choice, depends on the quality of the decision at the time of making the decision. A high-quality decision is characterized by the following elements:
 A useful frame
 Feasible and diverse alternatives
 Meaningful and reliable information
 Clear values, preferences, and trade-offs
 Logically sound reasoning
 Commitment to action

Quality in decision making requires quality in each of the elements listed above, and the overall quality of the decision is limited by the weakest element. Decision quality is achieved when for each element the cost to obtain additional information or insight to improve its quality exceeds the added value.

A variety of specific tools and processes exist to improve the quality of each element.

Framing 
The first element to achieve decision quality is framing. Having the appropriate frame ensures the right decision problem is addressed. Quality in framing is achieved when the decision makers have alignment on purpose, perspective, and scope of the decision problem to be solved. It means the right people will work the right problem the right way.

Options 
A decision cannot be better than the best available alternative (or option if there is more than one). A wide variety of approaches, tools, and methods exist to generate high quality options, ranging from systematic search approaches to identify options to approaches that aim to creatively synthesize options. Quality in options is achieved by applying a suitable options generation process, where the process itself leads to a variety of feasible and diverse options, which are hybrid solutions of originally considered options that combine their best features, and where for each options an understanding of its implementation exists.

Information 
The quality of a decision depends on the quality of the information to inform the decision. Quality in information is achieved when the information is meaningful and reliable, is based on appropriate data and judgment, reflects properly all uncertainties, biases, intangibles, and interdependencies, and the limits to the information are known. A wide variety of tools exist to improve the quality of the information used in the decision problem.

Values and trade-offs 
Quality in this element requires the identification of the right decision criteria and the definition of trade-off rules among them. This necessitates at first the identification of all key stakeholders, and what each of them values. Quality in this element of decision quality is characterized by transparent value metrics, a clear line of sight of the primary metric, and explicit trade-off rules between key metrics.

Sound reasoning 
This element is the domain of decision analysis, which aims to produce insight. Decision analysis provides the logic and analytic tools to find the best choice in a complex situation, and should serve as a guide to facilitate the conversation about the decision. A wide variety of tools, ranging from decisions trees, over hierarchies to complex network models is available to match the decision problem. Quality in this element is achieved when the value and uncertainty of each alternative is understood, and the best choice is clear.

Commitment to action 
The quality of a decision also depends on the commitment to act upon the choice that is made. Quality in this element is achieved by involving all key decision makers and stakeholders in an effective and efficient decision making process. At the end of the process, quality is characterized by buy-in across all stakeholders and an organization that is ready to take action and commit resources.

History and industry implementation 
Decision quality concepts were first developed in 1964, building on developments in statistical decision theory and game theory by Professor Howard Raiffa of Harvard University, and dynamic probabilistic systems by Professor Ronald A. Howard of Stanford University.  First implementation of DA/DQ concepts in a professional application is documented in Prof. Howard's paper "Decision Analysis: Applied Decision Theory." published in 1966. Since then, decision analysis tools and decision quality concepts have been adopted by many corporations to guide and improve their decisions.  Starting in 2014, the Society of Decision Professionals is recognizing organizations that made DQ a core competency across the entire organization with the Raiffa-Howard Award, presented annually.  Beyond organization-wide implementation, decision quality concepts can also be applied on multi-company projects.

See also
Decision analysis
Decision engineering
Decision model
Decision theory
Decision tree
Decision support
Influence diagram

References

External links
 Society of Decision Professionals, the professional society supporting decision professionals as the advisors of choice when facing important, complex decisions.
 Decision Analysis , a journal of the Institute for Operations Research and the Management Sciences
 Decision Analysis Affinity Group, DAAG, has merged with and become the annual conference of the Society of Decision Professionals. Formed as an informal group of DA practitioners, DAAG was started in 1995 by Tom Spradlin, John Palmer, and David Skinner.

Decision analysis